Oskari Frösén (born 24 January 1976 in Kristinestad) is a Finnish high jumper, who won a total of five national titles in the men's high jump event.

He won the 1995 European Athletics Junior Championships, finished ninth at the 2002 European Championships, eleventh at the 2005 World Championships, ninth at the 2006 European Championships, and eighth at the 2007 European Indoor Championships.

He also competed in the 2004 Olympics, but failed to qualify from his pool.

He has a better indoor mark of  achieved  in Tallinn in February 2004.

Achievements

References

1976 births
Living people
People from Kristinestad
Finnish male high jumpers
Athletes (track and field) at the 2004 Summer Olympics
Olympic athletes of Finland
Sportspeople from Ostrobothnia (region)
20th-century Finnish people
21st-century Finnish people